Bahawalpur cricket team was a first-class cricket side in Pakistan, representing the city of Bahawalpur.

It won the inaugural season of the Quaid-i-Azam Trophy in 1953–54, under the captaincy of Khan Mohammad.

Bahawalpur competed in Pakistan's first-class competitions in most seasons between 1953–54 and 2002–03. After nine seasons in the sub-first-class Inter-District Tournament, Bahawalpur returned to first-class status in the 2012–13 season.

At the end of the 2013–14 season Bahawalpur had played 219 first-class matches, with 55 wins, 83 losses, 79 draws and 2 ties. Bahawalpur's Twenty20 and List A cricket team is known as Bahawalpur Stags.

Honours 
Bahawalpur have won the Quaid-e-Azam Trophy twice.
 1953–54
 1957–58

Players

References

External links
 List of Quaid-e-Azam Trophy winners
 First-class matches played by Bahawalpur

Pakistani first-class cricket teams
Bahawalpur District